Landcare may refer to:

Australian Landcare Council, a now superseded Australian government body
Landcare in Australia, umbrella approach promoting land protection in Australia
Landcare Research, New Zealand
The Landcare movement in Australia
The National Landcare Program, underpinned by Natural Heritage Trust legislation and government funding in Australia